Jones Terrace is a prominent ice free terrace south of Mount Peleus, at the south end of the eastern segment of the Olympus Range, in Victoria Land. It was named by the Advisory Committee on Antarctic Names (1997) after Lois M. Jones, a geologist with the University of Georgia, leader of a 1969–1970 research party in the McMurdo Dry Valleys.

References

Terraces of Antarctica
Landforms of Victoria Land
McMurdo Dry Valleys